Associação Atlética Iguaçu, usually known simply as Iguaçu, is a Brazilian football team from the city of União da Vitória, Paraná state, founded on August 15, 1971. The club won the Campeonato Paranaense Second Division twice, in 1987 and in 1991.

Achievements
 Campeonato Paranaense Second Division: 1987, 1991, 1996

References

External links
 Associação Atlética Iguaçu official website

 
Football clubs in Paraná (state)
Association football clubs established in 1971
1971 establishments in Brazil
União da Vitória